Lists of state leaders in the 20th century include:

 List of state leaders in the 20th century (1901–1950)
 List of state leaders in the 20th century (1951–2000)
 List of governors of dependent territories in the 20th century
 List of state leaders in 20th-century British South Asia

Rulers
 
-